Stebe is a surname. Notable people with the surname include:

 Cedrik-Marcel Stebe (born 1990), German tennis player
 Kathleen J. Stebe, American scientist and professor

See also
 Steber
 Stene

German-language surnames